XHERS-FM is a radio station on 104.3 FM in Gómez Palacio, Durango. The station is owned by Radiorama and is an affiliate and operated of the El Heraldo Radio news/talk network.

History
XHERS began as XERS-AM 1380, with a concession awarded to Pánfilo González Flores on November 10, 1958. The station had actually signed on six years earlier, in 1952, as part of the 50th anniversary celebrations of the history of Gómez Palacio. In the late 1950s, the station briefly operated from across the state line in Torreón. By the 1960s, it was owned by Radio Catorce, S.A.

In 2007, Radio Catorce, S.A. changed its name and legal status to become Radiodifusora XERS-AM, S.A. de C.V.

On August 17, 2020, Éxtasis Digital moved to XHDN-FM 101.1, and XHERS-FM began broadcasting El Heraldo Radio.

References

Radio stations in Durango
Radio stations in the Comarca Lagunera